Bye, See You Monday is a 1979 French-Canadian drama film directed by Maurice Dugowson. It was entered into the 12th Moscow International Film Festival.

Plot
A French film based on a Canadian novel (by Roger Fournier) about two Montreal women (Carole Laure and Miou-Miou) in their late twenties who share an apartment and are involved in separate love affairs with married men. Their few pleasures are diminished by the disappointments they must suffer in these unequal relationships.

Cast

References

External links
 

1979 films
1979 drama films
Canadian drama films
French drama films
1970s French-language films
Films directed by Maurice Dugowson
French-language Canadian films
1970s Canadian films
1970s French films